Chiaia is an affluent neighbourhood on the seafront in Naples, Italy, bounded by Piazza Vittoria on the east and Mergellina on the west. Chiaia is one of the wealthiest districts in Naples, and many luxury brands have shops on its main street. It is also home to a business school and a medical school, as well as other public schools.

A prominent landmark in Chiaia is the large public park known as the Villa Comunale. It was initially developed in the late 16th and early 17th centuries as the Spanish rulers of Naples opened the city to the west of its historical boundaries.

The Renaissance poet Laura Terracina was born and raised in Chiaia.

Buildings and Structures in the zone

Castel dell'Ovo
Fontana del Sebeto
Palazzo Ravaschieri di Satriano
Santi Giovanni e Teresa
Pasquale a Chiaia
Sant'Orsola a Chiaia
Santa Caterina a Chiaia
Santa Maria Apparente
Santa Maria del Parto a Mergellina
Santa Maria della Neve in San Giuseppe
Santa Maria della Vittoria
Santa Maria di Piedigrotta
Santa Maria in Portico
Santa Teresa a Chiaia
Villa Pignatelli

Notes

References
 

Quartieri of Naples